Guillermo Javier Saputo (born May 1, 1977 in José C. Paz Partido, Buenos Aires) is a light middleweight boxer from Argentina, who represented his native country at two consecutive Summer Olympics, starting in 1996 in Atlanta, Georgia. He also represented Argentina at the 1995 Pan American Games and 1999 Pan American Games. Nicknamed "El Tano" and/or "El Caballero" he made his professional debut in 2001.

Professional boxing record 

|-
| style="text-align:center;" colspan="8"|17 Wins (11 knockouts), 0 Losses, 0 Draws
|-  style="text-align:center; background:#e3e3e3;"
|  style="border-style:none none solid solid; "|Res.
|  style="border-style:none none solid solid; "|Record
|  style="border-style:none none solid solid; "|Opponent
|  style="border-style:none none solid solid; "|Type
|  style="border-style:none none solid solid; "|Rd.,Time
|  style="border-style:none none solid solid; "|Date
|  style="border-style:none none solid solid; "|Location
|  style="border-style:none none solid solid; "|Notes
|- align=center
|Win||17-0||align=left| Gustavo Martin Lencina
|
|
|
|align=left|
|align=left|
|- align=center
|Win||16-0||align=left| Cesar Alberto Leiva
|
|
|
|align=left|
|align=left|
|- align=center
|Win||15-0||align=left| Ruben Dario Oliva
|
|
|
|align=left|
|align=left|
|- align=center
|Win||14-0||align=left| Ruben Dario Oliva
|
|
|
|align=left|
|align=left|
|- align=center
|Win||13–0||align=left| Javier Alejandro Blanco
|
|
|
|align=left|
|align=left|
|- align=center
|Win||12-0||align=left| Hector Amadeo Zelaya
|
|
|
|align=left|
|align=left|
|- align=center
|Win||11-0||align=left| Alejandro Jimenez
|
|
|
|align=left|
|align=left|
|- align=center
|Win||10-0||align=left| Miguel Angel Ramirez
|
|
|
|align=left|
|align=left|
|- align=center
|Win||9–0||align=left| Fray Luis Sierra
|
|
|
|align=left|
|align=left|
|- align=center
|Win||8–0||align=left| Alex Carrillo Villa
|
|
|
|align=left|
|align=left|
|- align=center
|Win||7–0||align=left| Ruben Munoz
|
|
|
|align=left|
|align=left|
|- align=center
|Win||6–0||align=left| Juan Carlos Alvarez
|
|
|
|align=left|
|align=left|
|- align=center

References

External links
 

1977 births
Living people
Sportspeople from Buenos Aires Province
Light-middleweight boxers
Boxers at the 1996 Summer Olympics
Boxers at the 2000 Summer Olympics
Olympic boxers of Argentina
Boxers at the 1995 Pan American Games
Boxers at the 1999 Pan American Games
Pan American Games competitors for Argentina
Argentine male boxers